Queer Person is a children's novel by Ralph Hubbard. It tells the story of a deaf-mute boy who is raised among the Pikuni. The novel, illustrated by Harold von Schmidt, was first published in 1930 and was a Newbery Honor recipient in 1931.

Plot summary
When a lost four-year-old deaf-mute wanders into a Pikuni camp he is shunned by them as marked by evil spirits.  They give him the name "Queer Person". An old medicine woman takes him in and raises him. She predicts greatness for him and ensures he is worthy of it. During his test of bravery as an adolescent, he rescues the chief's son. He wins the heart of the chief's daughter and eventually becomes a leader of the tribe.

References

1930 American novels
American children's novels
Newbery Honor-winning works
Novels set in Montana
1930 children's books